Guido Gómez (born 19 May 1994) is an Italian footballer of Argentine descent who plays as a forward for  club Crotone.

Club career
Born in Vico Equense, in the Province of Naples, Campania region, Gomez started his career at Emilian club Sassuolo. In 2013, he was farmed to Pro Vercelli. (in co-ownership deal for a peppercorn fee of €500) On 16 January 2014 he left for Lega Pro Seconda Divisione (ex–Serie C2) club Cuneo. Pro Vercelli was promoted back to Serie B while Cuneo relegated to Serie D respectively. Gomez personally made 13 league appearances in the whole season, as well a goal in 3 appearances in the cups. (Coppa Italia and Coppa Italia Lega Pro) in June 2014 Sassuolo bought Gomez back in a 2-year contract.

In July 2014 Gomez left for Juve Stabia in a temporary deal, for the first Lega Pro (ex–Serie C) season with only one division since 1978. The club later signed Gomez outright.

In summer 2016 Gómez was sold to Akragas, with Urban Žibert moved to Juve Stabia. On 31 January 2017 Gómez was signed by Catanzaro in a -year contract.

On 29 July 2019, he joined Triestina.

On 27 July 2022, Gómez signed a three-year contract with Crotone.

International career
Gomez scored 4 goals in 5 matches of 2013 Mediterranean Games for Italy under-19 team (de facto under-20 team as Italy had eliminated from 2013 UEFA European Under-19 Championship).

References

External links
 

1994 births
Living people
Footballers from Campania
Sportspeople from the Province of Naples
Italian sportspeople of Argentine descent
Italian footballers
Association football forwards
Serie C players
U.S. Sassuolo Calcio players
F.C. Pro Vercelli 1892 players
A.C. Cuneo 1905 players
S.S. Juve Stabia players
S.S. Akragas Città dei Templi players
U.S. Catanzaro 1929 players
A.C. Renate players
U.S. Triestina Calcio 1918 players
F.C. Crotone players
Italy youth international footballers